Platymiscium gracile is a species of plant in the family Fabaceae. It is found only in Peru.

References

Dalbergieae
Flora of Peru
Vulnerable plants
Taxonomy articles created by Polbot